Turkmenistan participated at the 2018 Summer Youth Olympics in Buenos Aires, Argentina from 6 October to 18 October 2018.

Competitors

Athletics

Boys

Girls

Basketball

Turkmenistan qualified a boys' team based on the U18 3x3 National Federation Ranking.

 Boys' tournament – 1 team of 4 athletes

 Boys' tournament

Judo

Individual

Team

Weightlifting

Turkmenistan qualified one athlete based on its performance at the 2018 Asian Youth Championships.

Boy

Girl

Wrestling

Key:
  – Victory by Fall
  – Without any points scored by the opponent
  – With point(s) scored by the opponent
  – Without any points scored by the opponent
  – With point(s) scored by the opponent

References

2018 in Turkmenistani sport
Nations at the 2018 Summer Youth Olympics
Turkmenistan at the Youth Olympics